Karl-Sören "Kalle" Hedlund (January 28, 1938 – September 26, 2021) was a Swedish ice hockey forward. He was known for being a member of the "Mosquito Line" on Skellefteå AIK together with Anders Andersson and Eilert Määttä. While both Andersson and Määttä won World Championships gold, Kalle's highest accolade was a bronze medal in 1958.

References

External links

1938 births
2021 deaths
Swedish ice hockey players
Skellefteå AIK players
VIK Västerås HK players